Cyphoderris buckelli, or Buckell's grig, is a species of hump-winged cricket in the family Prophalangopsidae. It is found in North America.

References

 Capinera J.L, Scott R.D., Walker T.J. (2004). Field Guide to Grasshoppers, Katydids, and Crickets of the United States. Cornell University Press.
 Otte, Daniel (1997). "Tettigonioidea". Orthoptera Species File 7, 373.

Further reading

 

Ensifera
Insects described in 1933